The Parichchedis were a medieval ruling clan in Andhra.

History 
The Parichchedis were initially the samantas (vassals) of the Chalukyas. They originated from social groups such as the besta (fisherman) and peasant groups of the Shudra varna. After becoming rulers, they claimed Kshatriya status. They also claimed descent from Durjaya. They were staunch patrons of Hindu Dharma in contrast to the Chalukyas, who initially were patrons of Jainism.

References

Telugu monarchs
Dynasties of India
Medieval India
Hindu dynasties